Shahanoor Dam is an earthfill dam on Shahanoor river near Anjangaon Surji, Amravati district in the state of Maharashtra in India.

Specifications

Purpose
 Irrigation
 Water Supply

See also
 Dams in Maharashtra
 List of reservoirs and dams in India

References

Dams in Amravati district
Dams completed in 1990
1990 establishments in Maharashtra